The 1986 Virginia Slims of Pennsylvania, also known as the VS of Pennsylvania, was a women's tennis tournament played on indoor carpet courts at the Hershey Racquet Club in Hershey, Pennsylvania in the United States that was part of the 1985 Virginia Slims World Championship Series. It was the fourth and last edition of the event and was played from March 3 through March 9, 1986. Unseeded Janine Thompson won the singles title.

Finals

Singles

 Janine Thompson defeated  Catherine Suire 6–1, 6–4

Doubles

 Candy Reynolds /  Anne Smith defeated  Sandy Collins /  Kim Sands 7–6, 6–1

References

External links
 International Tennis Federation (ITF) tournament edition details

Virginia Slims of Pennsylvania
Virginia Slims Of Pennsylvania, 1986